Events from the year 1663 in art.

Events
 Claude Lorrain completes his last etching, The Goatherd.

Paintings

Gerrit Dou – The Dropsical Woman
Pieter de Hooch
A Game of Nine Pins (approximate date of first version, Waddesdon Manor, England)
A Woman Peeling Apples
Elisabetta Sirani – Virgin and Child
Jan Vermeer
Woman Holding a Balance
Woman Reading a Letter
Young Woman with a Water Jug (Metropolitan Museum of Art, New York)

Births
January 20 - Luca Carlevarijs or Carlevaris, Italian painter of landscapes (died 1730)
date unknown
Michelangelo Cerruti, Italian fresco artist (died 1749)
Gennaro Greco, Italian painter, also known as "Il Mascacotta", veduta painter (died 1714)
Amalia Wilhelmina Königsmarck, Swedish painter (died 1740)
Louis Laguerre, French decorative painter working in England (died 1721)
Nicola Malinconico, Neapolitan painter (died 1721)
Pierre Drevet, French portrait engraver (died 1738)
Ogata Kenzan, Japanese potter and painter (died 1743)
Giovanni Odazzi, Italian painter and etcher (died 1731)
Giacomo Parolini, Italian painter of altarpieces (died 1733)
Robert van Audenaerde, Flemish painter and engraver (died 1748)
Sieuwert van der Meulen, Dutch painter (died 1730)
probable - Pietro da Pietri, Italian painter of an altarpiece for Santa Maria in Via Lata (died 1708, 1716, or 1721)

Deaths
July – Lubin Baugin, French painter (born 1610)
July 21 - Hendrickje Stoffels, model and mistress of Rembrandt (born 1626)
date unknown
Guido Cagnacci, Italian painter of the Bolognese School (born 1601)
Michel Dorigny, French painter and engraver (born 1617)
Balthazar Gerbier, Dutch art advisor and designer at the English court (born 1592)
Domenico Manetti, Italian painter (born 1609) 
Jan Miel, Flemish  painter (born 1599)
Francesco Allegrini da Gubbio, Italian painter of the Baroque period (born 1587)
Hendrick van Balen the Younger, Flemish painter (born 1621)
probable 
Michiel II Coignet, Flemish painter who specialized in small paintings for cabinets (born 1618) 
Chiara Varotari, Italian painter (born 1584)

 
Years of the 17th century in art
1660s in art